Shavez Hart (6 September 1992 – 3 September 2022) was a Bahamian track and field sprinter from Coopers Town Abaco Islands, who mainly competed in the 100 metres and 200 metres. His 100 metres  personal best of 10.10 seconds makes him the third fastest Bahamian of all time behind Derrick Atkins, and second fastest Bahamian-born sprinter. His 200 metres personal best of 20.23 makes him the fourth fastest Bahamian of all time.

He was a graduate of St. Georges High School in Freeport, Bahamas. He was the bronze medallist in the 100 m individual and relay events at the 2011 CARIFTA Games. At the 2011 Pan American Junior Athletics Championships he false started in the 100 m final but took the bronze with the Bahamian relay quartet.

He competed for South Plains College with compatriot Trevorvano Mackey, winning a sprint double at the 2012 National Junior College Championships, before transferring to Texas A&M University. They both teamed up to break the Bahamian national record in the 4×100 metres relay in Morelia, Mexico, winning the gold medal at the 2013 CAC Championships in the process.

On 3 September 2022, Hart was shot dead during a parking lot brawl in North Abaco, three days before his 30th birthday.

Personal bests

References

External links

South Plains College Profile

1992 births
2022 deaths
Bahamian male sprinters
Athletes (track and field) at the 2014 Commonwealth Games
Athletes (track and field) at the 2018 Commonwealth Games
Commonwealth Games competitors for the Bahamas
World Athletics Championships athletes for the Bahamas
Athletes (track and field) at the 2015 Pan American Games
Pan American Games competitors for the Bahamas
People from Freeport, Bahamas
Athletes (track and field) at the 2016 Summer Olympics
Olympic athletes of the Bahamas
People from Abaco Islands
People from North Abaco
World Athletics Indoor Championships medalists
Texas A&M Aggies men's track and field athletes
Deaths by firearm in the Bahamas
20th-century Bahamian people
21st-century Bahamian people